Sarajevo Business School is an international academic program in Bosnia and Hercegovina in collaboration of School of Economics and Business Sarajevo and Griffith College Dublin.

Undergraduate:
BA in Business Studies
Venue: Sarajevo & Dublin

Postgraduate:
MSc/MBA in International Business Management
Venue: Sarajevo

Business schools in Bosnia and Herzegovina
Universities in Bosnia and Herzegovina